The 2018 Singapore Premier League (also known as the Great Eastern Hyundai Singapore Premier League due to sponsorship reasons) was the inaugural season of the Singapore Premier League, the top-flight Singaporean professional league for association football clubs. The season began on 31 March 2018, and concluded on 3 October 2018. Albirex Niigata (S) won the league and successfully defended their title. 

Each team will receive $888,200 if they meet key performance indicators that will be made known to them before the March 31 kick-off.  This represents a "19 per cent reduction from the 2017 season", but funding for the league has been secured for the next five years.

It is the league's first season after rebranding from the S.League to the Singapore Premier League. A major overhaul from the new FAS management is being made from this season onwards to improve the standard of Singapore football.

An emphasis on youth development from the ground up is underway.

Rules 
The following key changes are being made to the rules for the 2018 season:

 It is compulsory for each of the SPL's six local clubs to recruit at least six Under-23 footballers for their squad, with a minimum of three Under-23 players to feature in the starting 11 for each match. The first U-23 player must be replaced by another, if the substitution occurs in the 1st half.  Beyond this, any U-23 players can be replaced by any other players.
 Depending on the squad size, each team is to sign at least eight local players aged 24 to 30.   A 25-man squad will need to have nine local U-23 players and 10 local players aged 24 to 30.
 Introduction of age quotas, with teams allowed to sign only two to six players above the age of 30, depending on squad size. For example, for squad between 19 and 22 players, there must be minimum of six under-23 players and 8 under-30 players. This will apply to all club except Young Lions and Albirex Niigata (S).
 Young Lions can sign a maximum of 33 players for the season.
 The foreign player quota for clubs will be reduced from three to two with no age restriction placed on them.
 Albirex Niigata (S) has age restrictions imposed by the FAS for the new season.  The squad will be made up of 50% of U23 players, 50% of U21 players and one player of any age. This is excluding 2 Singapore U-23 players which they can choose to sign.
 The Singapore Premier League lineup for 2018 will remain the same as Young Lions are set to compete in 2018.
 The Prime League will be scrapped with the National Football League (NFL) set to be installed as the second-tier competition.
 Yo-yo test will replace the current mandatory 2.4 km test, and players will be tested three times a year in the pre-season, midseason and off-season.
 All matches will be played during weekends at 5:30 p.m.

Teams 
A total of 9 teams compete in the league. Albirex Niigata (S) and DPMM FC are invited foreign clubs from Japan and Brunei respectively. Despite large criticism and discussion against the Young Lions project, the Young Lions will continue to compete till 2019 for the purposes of training and preparing for the 2019 SEA Games. The criticism mainly focused on the poor performances every season by the largely youth team made up of Singapore Football's brightest prospects. Season-long consecutive losses against the rest of the more mature teams inflicts serious long-term consequences on the morale of the players, considering that most of these players are in the developmental ages of their footballing career. The new age restrictions imposed on the rest of the Singapore Premier League clubs could be seen as giving the Young Lions a better advantage in terms of seniority, but most critics and fans of Singapore football are still wanting the FAS to abolish the FAS-managed Young Lions and have them developed under the guidance of genuine local clubs.

Stadiums and locations

Personnel and sponsors
Note: Flags indicate national team as has been defined under FIFA eligibility rules. Players may hold more than one non-FIFA nationality.

Note: 
1) ANA Courier Express is Tampines Rovers's Singapore Cup jersey sponsor only
2) Hougang United had a partnership with Assisi Hospice via its donation drive. Assisi Hospice will be published on the jersey

Coaching changes

Foreigners 
The foreign player quota for clubs will be reduced from three to two.

In addition, Albirex was reported to have declared their intention to have Singapore players in their squad for 2018 and is understood that a proposal is being put together for Albirex to take in local players and they will be allowed to sign two Singaporean U-23 players.
Only DPMM are allowed to sign up to three foreigners.

Players name in bold indicates the player was registered during the mid-season transfer window.

League table

Statistics

Top scorers
As of 3 October 2018.

Clean Sheets
As of 3 October 2018.

Hat-tricks

Singapore Premier League Awards night winners

References

External links
 Football Association of Singapore website
 Singapore Premier League website

2018
1
2018 in Asian association football leagues